Oren Harman is a writer and historian of science.

Biography 

Oren Harman was born in Jerusalem on January 25, 1973. He grew up and was educated in Jerusalem and in New York City, where he attended the Collegiate School for Boys and excelled at soccer (he was dubbed "the little Israeli magician" by New York Newsday). He graduated from Hebrew University Secondary School in Jerusalem. Harman studied history and biology at Hebrew University, where he graduated summa cum laude. He then received M.Sc. and D.Phil. degrees with distinction from Oxford University, before spending two years at Harvard University, conducting research and teaching in the Department of History of Science.

Harman was subsequently awarded the Alon Award for academic excellence, and was elected in 2003 to the Young Academy of Sciences of Israel. Between 2008-2021 he served as Chair of the Graduate Program in Science, Technology and Society at Bar-Ilan University and is a Senior Fellow at the Van Leer Jerusalem Institute, where he hosts the "Talking About Science in the 21st Century" public lecture series. His fields of expertise include the history and philosophy of modern biology, evolutionary theory, altruism,  historical biography, science and mythology, and the historiography of the life sciences.

Harman has written and edited books that have had a broad appeal to both academic and general audiences.The Man Who Invented the Chromosome (Harvard University Press, 2004) tells the story of the English scientist Cyril Dean Darlington, who tried to use biology to understand human history and culture, and whose ideas foreshowed much of the influential field of evolvability. The Price of Altruism, explores the evolutionary origins of altruism and the tortured polymath, George Price, who wrote an equation to help solve its apparent paradox. The book won the 2010 Los Angeles Times Book Prize in the category of Science and Technology, was long-listed for the Royal Society Winton Prize, was a New York Times Book of the Year, was nominated for the Pulitzer prize and has inspired theater plays and radio shows. Harman's book Evolutions: Fifteen Myths That Explain Our World (Farrar, Straus and Giroux, 2018) is an original rendering of the great events in the history of the universe, from the Big Bang to the evolution of consciousness and the birth of humankind. Harman is also the co-creator and editor, with Michael Dietrich, of a trilogy of books that offer new prisms for understanding the growth and development of the life sciences: Rebels (Yale, 2008), Outsiders (Chicago, 2013), and Dreamers (Chicago, 2018). He is co-editor with Dietrich and Mark Borrello of the Handbook of the Historiography of Biology. Harman's books have been translated into many languages including Polish, Chinese, Hebrew, Japanese, Korean, Italian, Turkish, and Malayalam.

Harman has been a frequent contributor to The New Republic, and Haaretz Magazine, and is the co-creator, with Yanay Ofran and Ido Bahat, of the Israeli-Oscar nominated television documentary series "Did Herzl Really Say That?", which explores changing cultural identities in Israel. His work has been featured in Science, Nature, The New York Times, The Times, TLS, The New York Review of Books, The Economist, Forbes, The Huffington Post, Radio Lab, among others.

Harman lives in Jerusalem with his wife, Yael, and their three kids.

Works
 The Man Who Invented the Chromosome. Cambridge, MA: Harvard University Press, 2004.
 Did Herzl Really Say That?! With Yanay Ofran. Director: Ido Bahat. Channel 8. 2006, 2007.
 Rebels, Mavericks and Heretics in Biology. With Michael Dietrich. New Haven, CT: Yale University Press, 2008.
 The Price of Altruism: George Price and the Search for the Origins of Kindness. New York: W.W.Norton/Bodley Head/Random House, 2010. 
 Outsider Scientists: Routes to Innovation in Biology. With Michael Dietrich. Chicago: University of Chicago Press. 2013
 Evolutions: Fifteen Myths That Explain Our World. New York: Farrar, Straus and Giroux. 2018
 Dreamers, Visionaries and Revolutionaries in the Life Sciences. With Michael Dietrich. Chicago: University of Chicago Press. 2018
 Handbook of the Historiography of Biology. With Michael Dietrich and Mark Borrello. Springer. 2020

References

External links
 Official Website
 "How Te Butterfly Got It's Spots", WSJ ‘Evolutions’ Review: How the Butterfly Got Its Spots
 "Analyzing Altruism", Forbes
 "Is Goodness in Yours Genes?", New York Review of Books
 Oren Harman on RadioLab (December 14, 2010)
 Harman on the New York Times' List of 2010's 100 Best Books
 Winner of the Los Angeles Times Book Prize in Science and Technology
 The Spectator 
 Discover Magazine
 The Economist
 Nature
 Nautilus 
 academia.edu Oren Harman | Bar-Ilan University - Academia.edu
 Oren Harman's 5 Best Books, Wall Street Journal
 The Polymath Who Wrote the History of Science in Poetry
 Can You Put Yourself Inside the Mind of a Trilobite? Oren Harman Has...

American science writers
Living people
Israeli Jews
1973 births